The USS Midway Museum is a historical naval aircraft carrier museum located in downtown San Diego, California at Navy Pier. The museum consists of the aircraft carrier . The ship houses an extensive collection of aircraft, many of which were built in Southern California.

History
The USS Midway was the United States' longest-serving aircraft carrier of the 20th century, from 1945 to 1992. Approximately 200,000 Sailors served aboard the carrier, known for several naval aviation breakthroughs as well as several humanitarian missions. It was the only carrier to serve the entire length of the Cold War and beyond. It is currently a museum ship in San Diego, California.

Midway opened as a museum on 7 June 2004. By 2012 annual visitation exceeded 1 million visitors. As of 2015 Midway is the most popular naval warship museum in the United States. The museum has over 13,000 members, and hosts more than 700 events a year, including more than 400 active-duty Navy retirements, re-enlistments, and changes of command. The museum also hosts approximately 50,000 students on field trips and 5,000 children in its overnight program annually.

Admission includes a self-guided audio tour, narrated by former Midway Sailors to more than 60 locations, including sleeping quarters, engine room, galley, bridge, brig, post office, foc's'le, pilots' ready rooms, officers quarters, primary flight control, and "officers country". Other features include climb-aboard aircraft and cockpits, videos, flight simulators, and a narrated audio tour for youngsters.

In addition to private events, the museum has hosted several events, including a nationally broadcast NCAA basketball game between San Diego State University and Syracuse University in 2012. American Idol has filmed an episode on Midway, as have the Travel Channel, Discovery Channel, FOX News, The Bachelor, Extreme Makeover, History Channel, and Military Channel. The nationally televised annual "Battle on the Midway" collegiate wrestling showcase has been staged each November on the flight deck of the museum since 2017.

Membership has grown to more than 25,000. A high definition, holographic movie theater, "The Battle of Midway Theater", was added in 2017, and in 2019 the museum added a virtual reality flight simulator ride in addition to its existing four flight simulators. The GI Film Festival and the San Diego International Film Festival have scheduled screenings at the museum.

See also
 U.S. Navy museums (and other aircraft carrier museums)
 National Naval Aviation Museum
 San Diego Air & Space Museum – Another air museum in San Diego located at Balboa Park

References

External links
 
 USS Midway Museum official website
 A podcast from Speaking of History about a tour of the USS Midway in July 2006

Aerospace museums in California
Maritime museums in California
Military and war museums in California
Midway
Museums established in 2004
Museums in San Diego
Naval museums in the United States